Russenorsk  (English: Russo-Norwegian) is an extinct dual-source "restricted pidgin" language formerly used in the Arctic, which combined elements of Russian and Norwegian. Russenorsk originated from Russian traders and Norwegian fishermen from Tromsø (northern Norway) and Kola (north-western Russia). It was used extensively in Northern Norway for about 150 years in the Pomor trade. Russenorsk is important as a test case for theories concerning pidgin languages since it was used far away from most of the other documented pidgins of the world.

As is common in the development of pidgins and trade languages, the interaction of  fishermen and traders with no common language necessitated the creation of some minimal form of communication. Like all pidgins, Russenorsk had a rudimentary grammar and a restricted vocabulary, mostly composed of words essential to Arctic fishing and trade (fish, weather, etc.); however, Russenorsk was used outside of fishing and trade context during the off-season as it was not uncommon for Russians to remain in Norway during the winter.

History
Barter existed between Russians and Norwegians for 150 years in Troms and Finnmark counties. This barter was supported by the Norwegian government, and King Christian VII conferred city status to several settlements, such as Tromsø, to facilitate it. Norwegians mainly traded fish for flour and wheat from Russians. The trading went on throughout the sunny months of the year and was beneficial to both sides; Norwegians had access to cheap fish in the summer, whilst Russians had surplus wheat. Traders came from the areas near Murmansk and the White Sea, most often to Vardø, Hammerfest, and Tromsø, occasionally further south to the Lofoten islands.

The earliest recorded instance of Russenorsk was in 1785. It is one of the most studied northern pidgins; many linguists, for example, Olaf Broch, studied it. Unlike equatorial pidgins, it was formed from only two languages, Norwegian and Russian. Furthermore, these languages are not from the same branch of Indo-European languages. Also unlike equatorial pidgins, Russenorsk was formed from one social class.

Until 1850, Russenorsk was socially acceptable for all social classes. In 1850, Russenorsk became more limited to Norwegian fishermen, whereas Norwegian traders learnt Russian through exposure in Archangelsk and Russian trade centers, often formally studying the language to the extent that they could communicate in rudimentary Russian. This increase in Russian study caused the devaluation of Russenorsk in terms of social status.

In 1917, Finland's declaration of independence from Russia caused the Russian–Norwegian border to decrease significantly. In 1919, the border disappeared completely. Furthermore, the Soviet Union limited international contact significantly, decreasing the need for the common language between Norwegians and Russians. The last such Norwegian–Russian trade occurred in 1923.

Phonology
Russenorsk uses many of the phonemes common to both Norwegian and Russian, altering phonemes only used in one. Pronunciation was depended on the language background of the speaker.
, absent in Norwegian, became :  ('how many?') → .
, absent in Norwegian, became :  ('good') → .
, absent in Russian, became :  ('half') → .
final voiced consonants, absent in Russian, became unvoiced:  ('sea') → 

More is known about the Norwegian variety of Russenorsk due to the fact that most of the texts in Russenorsk were written by Norwegians.

Vocabulary
Corpora of Russenorsk consist of lists of individual words and phrases as well as records of dialogues compiled by linguists such as Just Knud Qvigstad. The corpora include c. 400 words, about half of those only appear once in the records (so-called hapax legomena), therefore, the vocabulary contained only 150–200 core words.

The origin of its vocabulary is generally held to be approximately 40% Russian and 50% Norwegian, with the remaining 10% from Dutch, Low German, French, English, Sami, and Swedish. 

Many words in Russenorsk have a synonym from the other primary language.
,  (halibut)
,  (man)
,  (this)
,  (not)
Some words have an unclear etymology; for example,  or  can come from Russian, Swedish, or Finnish.

Some Russenorsk words survive in the dialect of Vardø:
 ('bread')

Grammar
One of the characteristics differentiating the pidgin from jargon is its grammar; however, Russenorsk did not go through tertiary hybridization. Russenorsk is mainly influenced by Norwegian grammar, leading some to conclude that it is a variant of Norwegian with some Russian influence.

A lack of metalinguistic awareness amongst Russenorsk speakers may have led them to believe they were speaking the language of their interlocutor; that is, that Russians believed they were speaking Norwegian and vice versa.

There are no clear verb conjugations. The main indication of a verb is the suffix , for example,  (the captain is asleep in his cabin). The general word order is SVO, with some alterations for questions and sentences with adverbs.

 is used as the only preposition for the oblique case:
For possession:  ('your watch')
For temporal relation:  ('tomorrow'),  ('last year').
For direction:  ('I will throw you in the water'),  ('How many days did you travel from here [to get] to Arkhangelsk?'),  ('go to Arkhangelsk').

Morphology
Russenorsk does not have extensive morphology, but has some unique characteristics. The ending  does not come from Russian nor Norwegian, but it may come from Solombala English.

Syntax
One characteristic syntactical attribute of Russenorsk is the tendency to move the verb to the final position when the sentence has adverbs. This is found in neither Russian nor Norwegian. Another is that the negator precedes the verb, but can be separated from the verb. This is unlike negation in either Russian or Norwegian, but it may have come from Finnish, in which this syntax was probable. Moreover, the use of barter-focused language established frequent use of interrogative speech in sentences.

Examples
 marks Russian origin,  marks Norwegian.

{| class=wikitable
|||||
|-
|моя́||påпо||твоя́
|-
|my||in||your
|-
|colspan="3"| 'I speak in your language.'
|}

{| class=wikitable
|||||||||
|-
|как||språk||моя́||нет||forstå
|-
|how||speak?||my||no||understand
|-
|colspan="5"| 'What are you saying? I don't understand.'
|}

Sentences

See also 
 Languages of Svalbard
 Kola Norwegians
 Bjarmaland
 Pomors
 Kyakhta Russian–Chinese Pidgin
 Mednyj Aleut language

Notes and references

Notes

References

Bibliography 
Broch, I. & Jahr, E. H. 1984. Russenorsk: Et pidginspråk i Norge (2. utgave), Oslo: Novus.
Broch, I. & Jahr, E. H. 1984.  "Russenorsk: a new look at the Russo-Norwegian pidgin in northern Norway." In: P. Sture Ureland & I. Clarkson (eds.): Scandinavian Language Contacts, Cambridge: C.U.P., pp. 21–65.
Jahr, E. H. 1996. "On the pidgin status of Russenorsk", in: E. H. Jahr and I. Broch (eds.): Language contact in the Arctic: Northern pidgins and contact languages, Berlin-New York: Mouton de Gruyter, 107-122.
Lunden, S. S. 1978. Tracing the ancestry of Russenorsk. Slavia Orientalis 27/2, 213–217.

Extinct languages of Europe
Norwegian language
Russian-based pidgins and creoles
Pomors
Languages attested from the 18th century
Languages extinct in the 19th century
Barents Sea
History of Finnmark
History of Murmansk Oblast
History of the Arctic
Norway–Russia relations